The British Rail Class D2/5 was a locomotive commissioned by British Rail in England. It was a diesel powered locomotive in the pre-TOPS period built by Andrew Barclay with a Gardner engine.

History
The Eastern and North Eastern Regions (E&NER) originally classified them DJ14 under a scheme devised in 1954 where "D" denoted Diesel, and "J" denoted the 0-6-0 wheel arrangement. They were subsequently reclassified by the E&NER D2/5 (February 1960) and then 2/12A (June 1962).

Fleet list
Building, renumbering and withdrawal occurred as follows:

See also

List of British Rail classes

Notes

References
 Ian Allan ABC of British Railways Locomotives, winter 1962/3 edition, pp 197–199

D002.05
Andrew Barclay locomotives
C locomotives
Railway locomotives introduced in 1956
Standard gauge locomotives of Great Britain
Scrapped locomotives